Cutters is an American sitcom starring Robert Hays that aired on CBS from June 11 until July 9, 1993.

Premise
A barbershop in Buffalo, New York has to share a building with a funky beauty salon when a wall is torn down.

Cast

Main
Robert Hays as Joe Polachek
Dakin Matthews as Harry Polachek
Margaret Whitton as Adrienne St. John
Julia Campbell as Lynn Fletcher
Julius Carry as Troy King
Robin Tunney as Deborah
Ray Buktenica as Chad

Recurring
 Alan Cumming as Leo
 Bob Newhart as Trevor 
 Gregory Hines as Bud

Guest stars
 Fred Willard as Mr Jackson 
 Norm Macdonald as Randy 
 Judith Light as Sandy

Episodes

References

External links
IMDb
TV.com
TV Guide

1993 American television series debuts
1993 American television series endings
1990s American sitcoms
English-language television shows
CBS original programming
Television series by ABC Studios
Television shows set in Buffalo, New York